The Megabuilders Volley Bolts is a professional men's volleyball team playing in the Premier Volleyball League based in San Juan, Metro Manila, Philippines.
The team is owned by One Mega Builders Construction Corporation	and mostly composed of NU Bulldogs volleyball players.

Current roster

 

Coaching staff
 Head Coach:  Dante Alinsunurin
 Assistant Coach(s):  Ariel "Dong" dela Cruz   Ruel Pascual

Team Staff
 Team Manager:  Jun Abcede 
 Team Utility:   Richard Estaclo

Medical Staff
 Team Physician:   Emilo Lee
 Physical Therapist: Ricol Gonizales

Previous roster

For the Premier Volleyball League 1st Season Open Conference:
 

Coaching staff
 Head Coach: Dante Alinsunurin
 Assistant Coach(s): Ariel "Dong" dela Cruz

Team Staff
 Team Manager: Jun Abcede
 Team Utility: 

Medical Staff
 Team Physician:
 Physical Therapist:

Honors

Team
Premier Volleyball League

Individual
Premier Volleyball League

Team Captains
 Francis Philipp Saura (2017)

Coaches
 Dante Alinsunurin (2017)

References

Premier Volleyball League (Philippines)
Men's volleyball teams in the Philippines
Sports teams in Metro Manila
2017 establishments in the Philippines